Apple Chan (born 12 March 1989) is a Singaporean actress and singer best known for portraying Lieutenant Zhang Xinyi in 2017 film Ah Boys to Men 4.

Personal life
Chan was born on 12 March 1989 in British Hong Kong, but moved to Singapore when she was four. She grew up in Singapore and attended Guangyang Primary School, First Toa Payoh Secondary School where she was in the softball team and the National Police Cadet Corps (NPCC), receiving the Best Cadet award and also a prom queen in her year of graduation. Chan graduated from LASALLE College of the Arts, majoring in Design Communication.

She enjoys taking her two-year-old pomeranian, Soju, out hiking, for a picnic at HortPark or Singapore Botanic Gardens, and explore different pet-friendly cafes.

She previously dated Hong Kong actor Owen Cheung for three years before breaking up in 2018.

Entrepreneurship
Apple Chan starts a S$2.5 million endoscopy centre, Curasia, in Jurong East with her First Toa Payoh Secondary School friends.She hopes that more lives will be saved as colorectal cancer has a high survival rate if detected early.

She also runs her own skincare business Apondle.

Filmography

Discography

Singles

References

External links
 

21st-century Singaporean actresses
Singaporean female models
Living people
Hong Kong emigrants to Singapore
Hong Kong film actresses
Hong Kong television actresses
Singaporean television actresses
Hong Kong female models
Hong Kong actresses
1989 births